Dmitry Bryzgalov (born 1 September 1991) is a Russian male acrobatic gymnast. He is a two-time World Championships bronze medalist (2012, 2014).

References

External links
 

1991 births
Living people
Russian acrobatic gymnasts
Male acrobatic gymnasts
Medalists at the Acrobatic Gymnastics World Championships
21st-century Russian people